The Lebanese Federation Cup was a Lebanese football annual cup competition. The competition was hosted five times, and served as the domestic League Cup. The cup was a preparatory competition held at the start of each season, in which the top four clubs in the previous Premier League season, along with the FA Cup finalists, participated.

Winners and finalists

Winners by year

Results by team

References

Federation Cup
Recurring sporting events established in 1969
1969 establishments in Lebanon
Lebanese Premier League